Deidenberg is a village in the German-speaking Community of Belgium. It is part of the municipality of Amel in the province of Liege (Wallonia).

Amel